Rachel Hannah (born 2 October 1986) is a 5 x Canadian Champion distance runner. She competed in the 2013 and 2015 IAAF World Cross Country Championships. She won the Canadian Cross Country Championships in 2014.  In 2015, she won a bronze medal in the Pan American Games marathon—her second marathon ever – with a time of 2:41:06. Hannah was born in Brampton, raised in Barrie, and lives in Port Elgin, Ontario. Rachel is also a Registered Dietitian.

References

1986 births
Living people
Sportspeople from Brampton
Canadian female marathon runners
Canadian female cross country runners
Athletes (track and field) at the 2015 Pan American Games
Pan American Games bronze medalists for Canada
Pan American Games medalists in athletics (track and field)
Medalists at the 2015 Pan American Games